Das Island Airport  is a private airfield operated by Abu Dhabi National Oil Company. It serves the oil field at Das Island, Abu Dhabi, United Arab Emirates.

References

Airports in the United Arab Emirates